First Take may refer to:

 First Take (album), a 1969 record album by Roberta Flack
 First Take (TV series), a television program on ESPN
 The First Take, a Japanese musical YouTube channel